Duke Wen of Qin (died 716 BC) was the seventh ruler of the Zhou Dynasty state of Qin that eventually united China to become the Qin Dynasty.  His ancestral name was Ying, and Duke Wen was his posthumous title.

Reign
Duke Wen succeeded his father Duke Xiang of Qin, who died in 766 BC while campaigning against the Quanrong in Qishan.  He moved the Qin capital back to Quanqiu (犬丘, also called Xichui, in present-day Li County, Gansu) from Qian (汧, in present-day Long County, Shaanxi), but in 762 BC moved the capital again to the confluence of the Qian and Wei rivers.

In 753 BC Duke Wen established the office of historiographer to record the official history of Qin.  In 750 BC he defeated the Rong tribes that were occupying the former Zhou land.  He returned the territory east of Qishan to Zhou, and kept the rest for Qin as King Ping of Zhou had promised Duke Wen's father Duke Xiang that Qin could keep the land west of Qishan if they could expel the Rong people.  The Qin territory was greatly expanded.

Succession
Duke Wen reigned for 50 years from 765 until 716 BC. His son, the crown prince, died before him in 718 BC and was given the posthumous title Duke Jing (秦竫公).  Duke Wen died in 716 BC and was succeeded by his grandson Duke Xian of Qin.

References

Rulers of Qin
8th-century BC Chinese monarchs
716 BC deaths